Marvel Studios Special Presentations are a series of television specials produced by Marvel Studios for Disney+, set within the Marvel Cinematic Universe (MCU), sharing continuity with the franchise's films and television series. The Marvel Studios Special Presentation banner was revealed alongside the announcement of the first television special, Werewolf by Night (2022), in September 2022. The approximately hour-long specials are envisioned to provide a short look at new characters or concepts to the MCU. The Special Presentations are accompanied by a special fanfare and opening reminiscent of the CBS Special Presentation intro from the 1980s and 1990s.

Werewolf by Night and The Guardians of the Galaxy Holiday Special (2022) are included in Phase Four of the MCU, both of which are holiday-themed. Marvel Studios is open to the idea of additional specials. The Special Presentation format has been praised for how it allowed Marvel Studios to tell contained stories that experiment with genre and style, and could introduced more obscure characters, while also not being beholden to long form storytelling as with their films and television series.

Development 
By September 2018, Marvel Studios was developing several limited series for Disney's new streaming service Disney+, to be centered on "second tier" characters from the Marvel Cinematic Universe (MCU) films who had not and were unlikely to star in their own films. Developing content for Disney+ allowed Marvel Studios to be flexible with formats, such as emulating one-off or annual holiday-themed television specials like A Charlie Brown Christmas (1965) and Frosty the Snowman (1969); those specials were usually 30 minutes to an hour, which was the length Marvel Studios was envisioning for their specials.

In December 2020, Marvel Studios announced The Guardians of the Galaxy Holiday Special for Disney+, to be released in late 2022, during the holiday season. The Holiday Special was the first piece of content Marvel Studios planned to create for Disney+. By August 2021, a Halloween-themed television special for Disney+ was in development, reportedly centered on Werewolf by Night. At the D23 Expo in September 2022, Marvel confirmed the Halloween special as Werewolf by Night, which was released in October. At that time, the "Marvel Studios Special Presentation" banner was revealed, under which Werewolf by Night and The Guardians of the Galaxy Holiday Special would be marketed. Marvel Studios executive Brian Gay called the Marvel Studios Special Presentations a "new format" for the studio, with each special meant to be a short look at "either a different story or a different area of the universe", such as introducing new characters or concepts to the MCU, and teasing how they could further integrate into the MCU with future appearances.

Michael Giacchino, the director of Werewolf by Night, said Marvel Studios president Kevin Feige was hopeful that Werewolf by Night would be "the first of a few one-and-done stories". By the release of Werewolf by Night, Marvel Studios had not determined any set release plan for potential future specials. By March 2023, a special centered on Mephisto was in production.

Logo and fanfare 
Special Presentations feature a special multicolored intro with bongo drum music, reminiscent of the CBS Special Presentation theme featured before animated holiday specials of the 1980s and 1990s. Giacchino (who directed and composed for Werewolf by Night) composed the fanfare, calling the opening a "love letter" to the broadcast networks' special presentation logos, which were used to indicate unique programming, something Marvel Studios wanted the Special Presentations to be as well. The intro was designed by Perception.

Jamie Lovett at ComicBook.com called the Marvel Studios Special Presentation intro "more colorful" and its fanfare "more playful" than the normal Marvel Studios intro, while Rachel Paige from Marvel.com called the fanfare "an absolute , and one sure to elicit that same level of excitement" when heard as the broadcast networks' special presentations did. Comic Book Resources Joshua M. Patton believed this intro would "have a similar effect on new generations of kids" as the older broadcast networks' introductions did, since it "evoke[s] the memory of its CBS counterpart" and signaled to viewers they were "about to see something exciting and new".

Specials 
All specials are being released on Disney+ and exist alongside the films and television series of their respective phase.

Phase Four

Future

Untitled Mephisto special 

In March 2023, Jeff Sneider of Above the Line reported that a special centered on Mephisto was being filmed on the set of the Disney+ series Agatha: Coven of Chaos, at Trilith Studios in Atlanta, Georgia. Sacha Baron Cohen was expected to reprise the role, after previously being rumored to appear as the character in the series Ironheart.

Cast and characters

Reception 

Following the release of Werewolf by Night, Tyler Llewyn Taing of /Film said the Special Presentations could "lead to more exciting genre and stylistic experiments in the MCU down the line" as Werewolf by Night was, and likened the hour-long television special format to Marvel Studios' One-Shot short films. As part of his Werewolf by Night review, Chris E. Hayner at GameSpot said the specials "should become a regular occurrence" if they could be as good as Werewolf by Night was. Rupesh Nair at IGN India compared the special format to one-shot comics and to DC Comics's Elseworlds publications, stating the Special Presentations have "elevated" the MCU and could be the franchise's "critical darings". He hoped future specials would be able to introduce unknown characters to audiences through stories that "allows directors and cast members to shine". Richard Newby of The Hollywood Reporter felt the format was "[the] MCU's most exciting prospect", stating that it was "a good idea [to] reduce the number of series, if not movies, and rethink them as Special Presentations, rather than six-to-nine-week commitments... [to] free up audiences and renew their investment in the universe, and allow filmmakers to stretch themselves creatively."

Documentary 
A documentary special for Werewolf by Night, titled Director by Night, was announced in September 2022, with Anthony Giacchino serving as writer and director. Director by Night was released on Disney+ on November 4, 2022, marketed with the "Marvel Studios Special Presentation" branding.

See also 
 Marvel One-Shots, short films by Marvel Studios

References 

 
Disney+ original programming
Lists of television specials